Difi, DiFi or DIFI can refer to:

 Agency for Public Management and eGovernment (Norwegian: Direktoratet for forvaltning og ikt, short: Difi), a Norwegian government agency subordinate
 Dianne Feinstein, American politician
 Difi (cell line), a type of cancer cell line
 Difi (river), a river in the Central African Republic
 Difi (watercourse), a watercourse in Guinea